Junonia stemosa, the twintip buckeye, is a species in the butterfly family Nymphalidae described in 2020. It is found in south Texas.

References

Further reading

 

Junonia